Tudor and KH domain-containing protein is a protein that in humans is encoded by the TDRKH gene.

References

Further reading